Cell Reports is a peer-reviewed scientific journal publishing research papers across a broad range of disciplines within the life sciences. The journal was established in 2012 and is the first open access journal published by Cell Press, an imprint of Elsevier.

Abstracting and Indexing 
The journal is currently indexed in PubMed, MEDLINE, Web of Science: Science Citation Index Expanded, and Scopus.

The journal has a 2020 impact factor of 9.995.

Subjournals
Cell Reports has other sister journals under the name of Cell Reports Medicine, Cell Reports Methods and Cell Reports Physical Science.

References

External links
 

Biology journals
English-language journals
Open access journals
Cell Press academic journals
Publications established in 2012
Monthly journals
Online-only journals